Louis Till (February 7, 1922 – July 2, 1945) was an African American GI during World War II. After enlisting in the United States Army following trial for domestic violence against his estranged wife Mamie Till, which he chose over jail time, Louis Till was court-martialed on two counts of rape and one count of murder in Italy. He was found guilty and was executed by hanging at Pisa. Louis Till was the father of Emmett Till, whose murder in August 1955 at the age of 14 galvanized the civil rights movement. The circumstances of Louis Till's death remained unknown to his family until they were revealed after the highly controversial aquittal of his son's murderers ten years later.

Life
Louis Till grew up an orphan in New Madrid, Missouri. As a young man he worked at the Argo Corn Company and was an amateur boxer. At age 17, Till began courting Mamie Carthan, a girl of the same age. Her parents disapproved, thinking the charismatic Till was "too sophisticated" for their daughter. At her mother's insistence, Mamie broke off their courtship, but the persistent Till won out, and they married on October 14, 1940 when both were 18.  Their only child, Emmett Louis Till, was born on July 25, 1941. Mamie left her husband soon after learning that he had been unfaithful. Louis, enraged, choked her to unconsciousness, to which she responded by throwing scalding water at him. Eventually Mamie obtained a restraining order against him. After he repeatedly violated this order, a judge forced Till to choose between enlistment in the United States Army and imprisonment. Choosing the former, he enlisted in 1943.

Criminal charges and death
While serving in the Italian Campaign, Till was arrested by Military Police, who suspected him and soldier Fred A. McMurray of the murder of an Italian woman and the rape of two others in Civitavecchia. A third soldier was granted immunity in exchange for testimony against McMurray and Till. After a short investigation, he and McMurray were court-martialed, found guilty, and sentenced to death by hanging. The sentence was carried out at the United States Army Disciplinary Training Center north of Pisa on July 2, 1945. Both soldiers had pleaded innocent; their defense team offered no evidence in support of their innocence, and Till stayed silent during the trial. Before the execution, Till was imprisoned alongside American poet Ezra Pound, who had been imprisoned for collaborating with the Nazis and Italian Fascists; he is mentioned in lines 171–173 of Canto 74 of Pound's Pisan Cantos:
"Till was hung yesterday
for murder and rape with trimmings"
Till was buried in the Naples Allied Cemetery. In 1948, his remains were moved to the Oise-Aisne American Cemetery Plot E.

According to information in The Fifth Field: The Story of the 96 American Soldiers Sentenced to Death and Executed in Europe and North Africa in World War II (Schiffer Publishing, 2013) author Colonel French L. MacLean, US Army Retired, had access to the complete court-martial record of the case to include witness statements and found that a Private James Thomas, who was tried separately, made a statement that he watched Louis Till and co-defendant Fred McMurray take 20 minutes to plan the home invasion; he stated that the men wore US Navy weather masks; he stated Till and McMurray had sex with the two women, both of whom had miscarriages later (one had been 8 months pregnant.) Investigators found a letter envelope at the scene of the crime addressed to Fred McMurray. McMurray made a statement at trial that just before the attack, Till said, "Everybody follow me: If anybody turns back I'll blast him." McMurray, who was also on trial, said that he begged Till not to shoot, but Till fired a shot into the house anyway: Signora Anna Zanchi was shot in the stomach and died several hours later at a U.S. Army hospital. Colonel Claudius O. Wolfe, the Staff Judge Advocate for the Peninsula Base Section (PBS) in Italy, reported that the record of trial was legally sufficient to support the findings of guilty. Brigadier General Francis H. Oxx, the Commander of the PBS, approved the findings. Colonel Adam Richmond, the Mediterranean Theater Judge Advocate, was said to have found no significant discrepancies and recommended that the sentence for each of the accused be confirmed. General Joseph T. McNarney, Commanding General of the Mediterranean Theater of Operations (MTO), confirmed the sentences for both men; Judge Advocates Irion, Sessions and Remick of the Branch Office of The JAG with the MTO found the trial to have been satisfactory and that Private Thomas' testimony had been corroborated in most of its important aspects.

Aftermath

The circumstances of Till's death were not revealed to his family; Mamie Till was told only that her husband's death was due to "willful misconduct". Her attempts to learn more were comprehensively blocked by the United States Army bureaucracy. The full details of Louis Till's criminal charges and execution emerged only ten years later. On August 28, 1955, 14-year-old Emmett Till was murdered in Mississippi, after allegedly making advances towards Carolyn Bryant, a local white woman. (Years later, a historian stated that Bryant disclosed to him that she had fabricated testimony that Till made verbal or physical advances towards her in the store. However, the family of Bryant has disputed this claim.) Her husband and brother-in-law abducted Till and tortured him to death, then threw his body into the river. Both were arrested a few days later, charged with and tried for first-degree murder, but were acquitted by an all-white jury in September 1955.

In October 1955, after the murder trial and acquittal gained international media attention, Mississippi senators James Eastland and John C. Stennis uncovered details about Louis Till's crimes and execution and released them to reporters. In November 1955, a grand jury declined to indict the two abductors for kidnapping Till despite the fact that they had given a magazine interview in which they admitted to having kidnapped Till.

The Southern media extensively covered the story. Various editorials claimed that the National Association for the Advancement of Colored People (NAACP) and the "Yankee" media had lied about the record of Emmett Till's father. Many of these editorials specifically cited an article in Life magazine, which presented Louis Till as having died fighting for his country in France. According to historians, Life magazine was an exception rather than the rule, and no other "northern" media had lionized Pvt. Till or embellished his record; additionally, Life later published a retraction. However, the impression was left among some southerners that the erroneous Life article was representative of the Northern media in general. Several other Southern editorials went so far as to associate Emmett Till with his father's crimes. They implied that Emmett may have attempted rape after the fashion of his father, thereby justifying his murder.

Challenge of trial's authenticity

In 2016, notable African-American novelist and essayist John Edgar Wideman explored the circumstances leading to and including the military conviction of Louis Till. In the partly fictional book Writing to Save a Life – The Louis Till File, Wideman examines the trial record and compares it to the trial of Emmett's killers, calling both "a farce", and expresses the belief that the leak of Mr. Till's military records during 1955 was an intentional effort to further demonize Emmett Till and retroactively justify the acquittal of his murderers. Wideman expresses the viewpoint that Louis Till may have been punished for the "Crime of being (Black)", rather than for committing any real crimes, citing the disproportionate punishment of African-American soldiers for rape as well as laws in the United States that defined all sexual encounters between African-American men and white women as rape.

Wideman's analysis of Till's murder trial alleged one of its witness insisted that the killer was a white person before recanting their statement, and in Till's rape trial, both victims said that they were assaulted in darkness and could not identify their attackers, declining to label Till or his co-defendant as suspects. Wideman believed that their execution, due to these inconsistencies, was racially motivated.

Ollie Gordon, one of Emmett Till's cousins, was recorded visiting Louis Till's grave in France for the final episode of the ABC documentary series Let the World See, which aired in January of 2022. Referencing Wideman's analysis of Till's murder and rape trails, she said "He's laying in this less than honorable area for a crime that we're still not sure that he committed."

See also
 Capital punishment by the United States military
 Capital punishment in the United States
 List of people executed by the United States military

References

1922 births
1945 deaths
20th-century executions by the United States military
20th-century executions of American people
African-American United States Army personnel
African Americans in World War II
American people convicted of murder
American people convicted of rape
American people executed for murder
Executed African-American people
Executed people from Missouri
Murder in Italy
People executed by the United States military by hanging
People convicted of murder by the United States military
People from New Madrid, Missouri
Till family
United States Army soldiers
United States Army personnel of World War II
United States Army personnel who were court-martialed